Object may refer to:

General meanings 
 Object (philosophy), a thing, being, or concept
 Object (abstract), an object which does not exist at any particular time or place
 Physical object, an identifiable collection of matter
 Goal, an aim, target, or objective
 Object (grammar), a sentence element, such as a direct object or an indirect object

Science, technology, and mathematics

Computing 

 3D model, a representation of a physical object
 Object (computer science), a language mechanism for binding data with methods that operate on that data
 Object-orientation (disambiguation), in which concepts are represented as objects
 Object-oriented programming (OOP), in which an object is an instance of a class or array
 Object (IBM i), the fundamental unit of data storage in the IBM i operating system
 Object (image processing), a portion of an image interpreted as a unit
 Object file, the output of a compiler or other translator program (also known as "object code")
 HTML object element

Mathematics
 Object (mathematics), an abstract object arising in mathematics
 Group object, a generalization of a group built on more complicated structures than sets
 Object, an entity treated by mathematical category theory

Physics
 Physical body or object, in physics, an identifiable collection of matter
 Planetary body or planetary object, any secondary body in the Solar system that has a planet-like geology

Other sciences
 Astronomical object
 In object relations theory of psychoanalysis, that to which a subject relates

Arts and media 
 Object (Le Déjeuner en fourrure), a sculpture by Méret Oppenheim
 An Object, an album by No Age, 2013
 "Object", a song by the Cure from Three Imaginary Boys, 1979
 "Object", a song by Ween from La Cucaracha, 2007
 The Object, a prop used by Hipgnosis for the Led Zeppelin album Presence

Other uses 
 Object language (disambiguation)
 Object (National Register of Historic Places), a classification used by the U.S. National Register of Historic Places
 Object: Australian Design Centre, a non-profit organisation promoting design in Australia
 Object theory (disambiguation)
 Объект (object), (Russian GABTU), military vehicle designations

See also 
 Artifact (disambiguation)
 Objection (disambiguation)
 Objective (disambiguation)
 Objet d'art, works of art that are not paintings; large or medium-sized sculptures, prints or drawings